Reigilaid is a former small islet in the Baltic Sea belonging to the country of Estonia. Now a peninsula of Hiiumaa island.

See also
 List of islands of Estonia

References

External links
GeoApe

Peninsulas of Estonia
Hiiumaa Parish